Denholme is a civil parish in the metropolitan borough of the City of Bradford, West Yorkshire, England.  It contains 17 listed buildings that are recorded in the National Heritage List for England.  All the listed buildings are designated at Grade II, the lowest of the three grades, which is applied to "buildings of national importance and special interest".  The parish contains the small town of Denholme and the surrounding countryside.  The listed buildings consist of houses and cottages, farmhouses and farm buildings, three churches and associated structures, three mileposts, and a war memorial.


Buildings

References

Citations

Sources

 

Lists of listed buildings in West Yorkshire